Anne-Brit Kolstø (born 21 May 1945) is a Norwegian microbiologist.

She took her dr.philos. degree in biochemistry at the University of Tromsø, and is now a professor of microbiology at the Department of Pharmaceutical Biosciences, University of Oslo. From 2002 to 2005 she served as prorector of the University of Oslo.

She is a fellow of the Norwegian Academy of Science and Letters and the Royal Norwegian Society of Sciences and Letters. She is also a deputy board member of the Norwegian University of Life Sciences.

She was married to fellow professor Hans Prydz (1933–2011). They resided at Smestad.

References

External links
 

1945 births
Living people
University of Oslo alumni
University of Tromsø alumni
Academic staff of the University of Oslo
Norwegian biochemists
Norwegian microbiologists
Members of the Norwegian Academy of Science and Letters
Royal Norwegian Society of Sciences and Letters
Women microbiologists